Berezovka is a rural locality (a selo) and the administrative center of Beryozovsky Selsoviet, Tyumentsevsky District, Altai Krai, Russia. The population was 677 as of 2013. It was founded in 1907. There are 7 streets.

Geography 
Berezovka is located 29 km southeast of Tyumentsevo (the district's administrative centre) by road. Sosnovka is the nearest rural locality.

References 

Rural localities in Tyumentsevsky District